Elif , or more popularly Elifköy, is a town in Araban district of Gaziantep Province, Turkey. The population of the town was 3.902 of 2019. In the 2nd or 3rd century the town was a Roman settlement named Sugga. The mausoleum in the town is a Roman building. Elif was declared a seat of township in 1994. Major economic activity is pistachio farming. Some Elif residents work in construction sector.

See also
Roman mausoleum of Elif

References

Populated places in Gaziantep Province
Towns in Turkey
Araban District
Villages in Araban District